The Abu Bakar Royal Mosque is Pahang's royal mosque which is located in Pekan, Pahang, Malaysia. It was officially opened in 1976 by Sultan Ahmad Shah of Pahang replacing the nearby Abdullah Mosque or Old Royal Mosque.

Its interesting features include the royal mausoleum.

Abdullah Mosque
The Abdullah Mosque or Old Royal Mosque is an old royal mosque of Pahang located near royal mausoleum and the new mosque (Abu Bakar Royal Mosque). The mosque was built in 1928, after an 8-year construction period, during the reign of Sultan Abdullah Al-Mu’tassim Billah Shah and was officially opened on 8 January 1932 by Tengku Mahkota Abu Bakar ibn Sultan Abdullah Al-Mu’tassim Billah Shah on behalf of his father. It's named after the sultan who commissioned its construction. It may accommodate around 2000 worshippers in total at full capacity. Admission for getting in or seeing it is free. This cultural building is easily readable by foot, near Johor.

The Abdullah Mosque was constructed in Moorish style and was the principal mosque in Pekan for performing Friday prayers from 1932 until 1976.

Royal Mausoleum

List of graves
This is a list of Sultans and members of the royal family who have been laid to rest in the mosque.

Sultan graves
 Sultan Abu Bakar Riayatuddin Al-Muadzam Shah ibni Almarhum Sultan Abdullah Al-Mutassim Billah Shah (died 1974)
 Sultan Haji Ahmad Shah Al-Musta’in Billah ibni Almarhum Sultan Abu Bakar Ri’ayatuddin Al-Mu'adzam Shah (died 2019)

Tengku Ampuan/Sultanah graves (Graves of Royal Consorts)
 Tengku Ampuan Fatimah binti Al-Marhum Sultan Haji Sir Alang Iskandar Shah Kaddasullah (died 1988)
 Tengku Ampuan Afzan binti Al-Marhum Tengku Muda Tengku Sir Haji Muhammad (died 1988)

Royal family graves

Tengku Ahmad Iskandar Shah ibni Sultan Haji Abdullah II (died 1990)

Tengku Datuk Puteri Kamariah binti Almarhum Sultan Haji Sir Abu Bakar (died 2006)

Tengku Ibrahim Shah ibni Almarhum Sultan Haji Sir Abu Bakar - 'Tengku Bedahara (died 1988)

Tengku Abdullah ibni Almarhum Sultan Haji Sir Abu Bakar - Tengku Bedahara (died 2018)

Tengku Hajjah ‘Ainul Jamil binti Almarhum Sultan Haji Sir Abu Bakar -  Tengku Sri Nila Utama (died 2012)

Tengku Putri Nur Aziah binti Almarhum Sultan Haji Sir Abu Bakar (died 1972)

Y.Bhg. Dato’ Hajjah Rafeah binti Haji Buang Tok Puan Setia Perkasa (died 23rd July 2002)Tengku Abdul Hazziz Shah ibni Almarhum Sultan Haji Sir Abdullah I - Tengku Temenggung (died 1990) 
Tengku Ahmad ibni Almarhum Sultan Haji Sir Abdullah I - Tengku Temenggung (died 1990)Tengku Muhammad ibni Almarhum Sultan Haji Sir Ahmad al-Muazzam Shah I, Tengku Muda and Pahang MB (died 1959)Non-royal family graves
Dato’ Hajjah Rafeah binti Haji Buang (Rafeah Buang) - Malay singer (died 2002)''

References

See also
 Islam in Malaysia

Mosques in Pahang
Mausoleums in Malaysia
Mosques completed in 1976
1976 establishments in Malaysia